"Brown Eyed Handsome Man" is a rock and roll song written and recorded by Chuck Berry, originally released by Chess Records in September 1956 as the B-side of "Too Much Monkey Business." It was also included on Berry's 1957 debut album, After School Session. The song title was also used as the title of a biography of Berry.

Background and recording
"Brown Eyed Handsome Man" was written after Berry visited several African-American and Hispanic areas in California. During his time there, he saw a Hispanic man being arrested by a policeman when "some woman came up shouting for the policeman to let him go."

"Brown Eyed Handsome Man" was recorded at Universal Recording Corporation in Chicago, Illinois on April 16, 1956. The session was produced by the Chess brothers, Leonard and Phil. Backing Berry were Johnnie Johnson on piano, L. C. Davis on tenor saxophone, Willie Dixon on bass, and Fred Below on drums.

The song was released in September 1956 and reached number 5 on Billboard magazine's R&B Singles chart later that year.

Relevance in race relations
Glenn C. Altschuler, in a caption to photo of Berry, states that the lyrics of the song "played slyly with racial attitudes and even fears."  Martha Bayles noted that "Berry's penchant for bragging about his 'Brown Eyed Handsome Man's appeal for white females outraged a lot of people."

Cover versions
The song has been covered by many artists, including Buddy Holly, whose recording was a posthumous hit in the United Kingdom in 1963, where it peaked at number three, and was released on the album Reminiscing, which reached number two on the UK Albums Chart. Holly's version also peaked at number three in Ireland.  Johnny Rivers also covered the song on his first album, At the Whisky à Go Go, in 1964, as did Nina Simone on her 1967 album High Priestess of Soul and Waylon Jennings on a single from his 1970 album Waylon. It was also covered by Robert Cray on the 1987 live tribute album to Berry, Hail! Hail! Rock 'n' Roll and by Paul McCartney on his 1999 album Run Devil Run and on a double A-side single with "No Other Baby".

The song was also performed by the so-called "Million Dollar Quartet": Johnny Cash, Carl Perkins, Jerry Lee Lewis, and Elvis Presley in a jam session on December 4, 1956. Lewis also released a solo version on his 1970 album She Even Woke Me Up to Say Goodbye. Cash recorded it with Perkins on his posthumous 2003 album Unearthed. "Brown Eyed Handsome Man" was performed in the Broadway musical Million Dollar Quartet, which opened in New York in April 2010, and was included in the album Million Dollar Quartet, recorded by the original Broadway cast, with Lance Guest as Johnny Cash, Robert Britton Lyons as Carl Perkins, Levi Kreis as Jerry Lee Lewis, and Eddie Clendening as Elvis Presley.

It was also covered by Lyle Lovett on his 2012 album Release Me.

The song is loosely referenced in John Fogerty’s song "Centerfield" with the line, “A-roundin' third, and headed for home, It's a brown-eyed handsome man.”

References

1956 songs
1956 singles
1963 singles
Songs written by Chuck Berry
Chuck Berry songs
Buddy Holly songs
Johnny Rivers songs
Nina Simone songs
Paul McCartney songs
Waylon Jennings songs
Johnny Cash songs
Carl Perkins songs
Jerry Lee Lewis songs
Songs released posthumously
Chess Records singles
Coral Records singles